Sauterina is a genus of moths in the family Gracillariidae.

Species
Sauterina hofmanniella (Schleich, 1867)

External links
Global Taxonomic Database of Gracillariidae (Lepidoptera)

Acrocercopinae
Gracillarioidea genera